Elections to Bournemouth Borough Council on the south coast of England were held on 6 May 1999. The whole council (a unitary authority) was up for election.

Results

|}

References

1999 English local elections
1999
20th century in Dorset